Chalo Ishq Ladaaye ( Come, Let's Fall In Love) is a 2002 Indian comedy film directed by Aziz Sejawal, starring Govinda, Rani Mukerji, Zohra Sehgal and Kader Khan.

Plot
Popular but lonely Bollywood actress, Sapna, lives a fairly isolated life, though publicly she is thronged by fans, and has taken to drinking to ease her loneliness. Intoxicated, she runs her vehicle into a young man named Pappu, who suffers minor injuries. He recognizes her and tells her that he is her number-one fan and will do anything for her. She wants him to kill her double-timing boyfriend, Rahul (Sanjay Suri). He agrees to do so, provided she kills his overbearing grandmother, to which she agrees.

After Pappu completes his gruesome task, he meets with Sapna, only to be told that she does not recognize him, but when presented with proof, she relents and agrees to fulfill her part of this trade. She, along with Kokibhai, arrive at the palatial home of Pappu's grandmother and set out to kill her.

ACP Kamat already has evidence linking Pappu to Rahul's sudden death and has been keeping a close eye on his whereabouts. Pappu finds out his grandmother's will had stated that after her death Pappu would get all her property. Pappu asks for forgiveness.

Meanwhile, Sapna finds out that Pappu had not killed Rahul. Sapna finds out Pappu is with the police. A blackmailer tells Sapna to bring 5 crores. ACP Kamat tells his brothers about the money. Kamat told his brothers that Rahul was not killed and was still alive. Kamat's assistant knows that there was something wrong so he brings Pappu with him. His grandma comes and kills all the bad guys. Pappu beats up the ACP. When Paapu tells his feelings to Suniel Shetty, he takes her inside the theater. Sapna tells Pappu her feelings. The movie ends when she runs up to him and hugs him.

Cast
 Govinda as Pappu
 Rani Mukerji as Sapna 
 Kader Khan as Kokibhai
 Zohra Sehgal as Dadi (Pappu's grand mother)
 Sanjay Suri as Rahul
 Johnny Lever as Police Officer
 Mink Singh as Bobby
 Gulshan Grover as ACP Kamat
 Suniel Shetty as himself (special appearance)
 Asrani
 Mushtaq Khan
 Mukesh Khanna
 Ishrat Ali
 Razak Khan

Soundtrack

Music by Himesh Reshammiya. Lyrics by Sameer.

References

External links
 

2002 films
2000s Hindi-language films
Films scored by Himesh Reshammiya
Films directed by Aziz Sejawal